Observatório da Imprensa (Portuguese for Press Observer) is a Brazilian website, and also television and radio programs, which focuses on the analysis of the current state of the mass media in the country.

History
Observatório da Imprensa was launched in April 1996 as a website, edited by Alberto Dines. It was an initiative of the Institute for the Development of Journalism (Projor) and an original project of the Laboratory for Advanced Studies in Journalism (Labjor) of the Universidade Estadual de Campinas (Unicamp). It is currently funded by the Ford Foundation.

In May 1998, Observatório da Imprensa was launched as a weekly TV program, hosted by Dines and produced by public broadcasters TV Cultura and TVE Brasil (currently TV Brasil). On 2008, the São Paulo State government, which maintains TV Cultura, announced that it would cancel the program, which is currently produced by federal government-run TV Brasil only.

In May 2005, Observatório da Imprensa was launched as a radio program, broadcast daily on public and educational networks. The programs are available in the website as podcasts.

Broadcast
Observatório da Imprensa is broadcast on several public and educational radio and television networks throughout Brazil.

Television

Radio

External links
Observatório da Imprensa
Observatório da Internet

1998 Brazilian television series debuts
2005 radio programme debuts
Media analysis organizations and websites
Public radio programs
Radio series about the media
Criticism of journalism
Talk radio programs
Television series about the media
Brazilian radio programs
Brazilian news websites